In mathematics, a cyclically ordered group is a set with both a group structure and a cyclic order, such that left and right multiplication both preserve the cyclic order.

Cyclically ordered groups were first studied in depth by Ladislav Rieger in 1947. They are a generalization of cyclic groups: the infinite cyclic group  and the finite cyclic groups . Since a linear order induces a cyclic order, cyclically ordered groups are also a generalization of linearly ordered groups: the rational numbers , the real numbers , and so on. Some of the most important cyclically ordered groups fall into neither previous category: the circle group  and its subgroups, such as the subgroup of rational points.

Quotients of linear groups
Moreover, every cyclically ordered group can be expressed as such a quotient group.

The circle group
 built upon Rieger's results in another direction. Given a cyclically ordered group  and an ordered group , the product  is a cyclically ordered group.

By analogy with an Archimedean linearly ordered group, one can define an Archimedean cyclically ordered group as a group that does not contain any pair of elements  such that  for every positive integer . Since only positive  are considered, this is a stronger condition than its linear counterpart. For example,  no longer qualifies, since one has  for every .

As a corollary to Świerczkowski's proof, every Archimedean cyclically ordered group is a subgroup of  itself.

Topology

Related structures
 showed that a certain subcategory of cyclically ordered groups, the "projectable Ic-groups with weak unit", is equivalent to a certain subcategory of MV-algebras, the "projectable MV-algebras".

Notes

References

Further reading

. Translation of 

. Translation from Sibirskii Matematicheskii Zhurnal, 46–53

Ordered groups
Circles